Cnephasia asseclana, the flax tortrix, is a moth of the family Tortricidae. It is found all over Europe.

The wingspan is 15–18 mm. Adults are on the wing from June to August.

The caterpillars feed on a wide range of herbaceous plants and even dry leaves, and can become a pest. They initially mine the leaves. Later they spin together leaves or flowers for pupation.

Taxonomy
The flax tortrix is part of a cryptic species complex, and its taxonomy has been quite confused. For long, it was known as "C. wahlbomiana", a name that has led to many misidentifications (see below) until it was finally suppressed in favor of C. virgaureana. That, however, subsequently turned out to refer to the same species as the earlier-described C. asseclana, and thus the latter name became the senior synonym. Obsolete scientific names (junior synonyms and others) of C. asseclana are:
 Cnephasia confluens Réal, 1952
 Cnephasia interjectana (Haworth, [1811])
 Cnephasia latior Réal, 1953
 Cnephasia mediocris Réal, 1953
 Cnephasia oleraceana (Gibson, 1916)
 Cnephasia virgaureana (Treitschke, 1835)
 Cnephasia virgaurenana (lapsus)
 Cnephasia wahlbomiana (Linnaeus, 1758)
 Sciaphila virgaureana Treitschke, 1835
 Tortrix interjectana Haworth, [1811]
 Tortrix oleraceana Gibson, 1916
 Tortrix wahlbomiana Linnaeus, 1758

"C. wahlbomiana"  was also variously applied to C. alticolana, C. cupressivorana, C. communana, C. genitalana, and probably others of the C. asseclana complex. In at least one seminal study, it was even used for Eana derivana as it seems.

Footnotes

References
  (2009): Online World Catalogue of the Tortricidae – Cnephasia asseclana. Version 1.3.1. Retrieved 2009-JAN-20.
  (1978): Biologie comparée et étude systématique des tordeuses nuisibles du genre Cnephasia ["Comparative biology and systematic study of pest tortrix moths of genus Cnephasia"]. Cahiers de liaison de l'OPIE 29(2): 4-7 [in French]. PDF fulltext 
  (2005): Markku Savela's Lepidoptera and some other life forms – Cnephasia asseclana. Version of 2005-SEP-14. Retrieved 2010-APR-14.
  (1942): Eigenartige Geschmacksrichtungen bei Kleinschmetterlingsraupen ["Strange tastes among micromoth caterpillars"]. Zeitschrift des Wiener Entomologen-Vereins 27: 105-109 [in German]. PDF fulltext

External links

UKmoths

asseclana
Moths of Europe
Moths described in 1775
Insects of Turkey